Ana Sinatashvili (born 29 June 1996) is a Georgian footballer who plays as a forward for FC Martve. She has played officially for the senior Georgia women's national team.

International career
Sinatashvili capped for Georgia at senior level during the UEFA Women's Euro 2017 qualifying Group 6, in a 0–3 home loss to the Czech Republic on 22 September 2015.

References

1996 births
Living people
Women's association football forwards
Women's footballers from Georgia (country)
Georgia (country) women's international footballers
FC Martve players